is a railway station on the Fujikyuko Line in the town of Nishikatsura, Yamanashi, Japan, operated by Fuji Kyuko (Fujikyu).

Lines

Station layout

The station is staffed and consists of an island platform serving two tracks, with the station building located on the south (down) side of the tracks. Passengers cross the track to the platform via a level crossing. It has a waiting room and toilet facilities. The station is attended.

Platforms

Adjacent stations

History
Mitsutōge Station opened on 19 June 1929, initially named . It was renamed on 20 September 1943.

Passenger statistics
In fiscal 1998, the station was used by an average of 651 passengers daily.

Surrounding area
 Mount Mitsutōge
 Nishikatsura Junior High School
 Nishikatsura Elementary School
 Chūō Expressway

In popular media
The station was used as a location in the TV Asahi drama .

References

External links

 Fujikyuko station information 

Railway stations in Yamanashi Prefecture
Railway stations in Japan opened in 1929
Stations of Fuji Kyuko
Nishikatsura, Yamanashi